Q.S. Serafijn (born February 19, 1960) is a Dutch conceptual artist and author, who is working as sculptor, photographer, and installation artist.

Life and work 
Born in Roosendaal en Nispen, Q.S. Serafijn attended the Academie voor Beeldende Vorming (now Fontys Hogeschool voor de Kunsten) in Tilburg from 1978 to 1983 and the Ateliers '63 in Haarlem from 1983 to 1986.

After graduation he settled as an independent artist in Rotterdam in 1991. He also lecturer visual arts and art theory at the Jan Van Eyck Academie from 1991 to 1993, visual arts at the Willem de Kooning Academie from 1993 to 1999 and visual arts and art theory at the Gerrit Rietveld Academie since 2007. In 1992 Q.S. Serafijn received the Charlotte Köhler Award, an incentive prize of the Prins Bernhard Cultuurfonds.

For the city center of Doetinchem Q.S. Serafijn and the Dutch architect Lars Spuybroek designed the so-called D-tower, a large, interactive sculpture connected to a website that surveys the emotional lives of the inhabitants. In 2010 Q.S. Serafijn and sculptor Gijs Assmann (born 1966) released the equestrian statue, entitled John Wayne, in the  Wateringse Veld, a new district of Den Haag.

Selected publications 
 Lily Van Ginneken, Jaap Guldemond, Q.S. Serafijn (1990), Panorama. 
 Q.S. Serafijn (2003). Museum als pretpark!: aantekening 0437. 
 Q.S. Serafijn (2007), Het Czaar Peter Dossier. 
 Q.S. Serafijn, Jasper Henderson (2010), Het wonder van Wateringse Veld. 
 Q.S. Serafijn, Rudolf Gerard Abel Kaulingfreks, Jasper Henderson (2012), Q. S. Serafijn, notes 3.

References

External links 

 Q.S. Serafijn at qsserafijn.nl

1960 births
Living people
Dutch artists
Dutch writers
Academic staff of Willem de Kooning Academy
Academic staff of Gerrit Rietveld Academie
People from Roosendaal